Patrick Alexander (1926 – 1997 or 2003) was a British novelist, thriller writer, journalist and screenwriter.

His novel Death of a Thin-Skinned Animal won the Crime Writers' Association "John Creasey Memorial Award" and was filmed in 1981 as Le Professionnel starring Jean-Paul Belmondo. Stephen Hunter admits that Alexander's novel inspired his own novel Dead Zero and questions where the inspiration ends and the theft of Alexander's idea begins.

Alexander was a chess fanatic; people in his novels often share his enthusiasm for the game. Death of a Thin-Skinned Animal features a "considerable description of a tournament" that chess player Stewart Reuben had organised.

Bibliography

Novels

 Death of a Thin-Skinned Animal (1976)
 Show Me A Hero (1979)
 Soldier On The Other Side (1983)
 Ryfka (1988)

Screenplays

 Studio One (TV series) (1948)
 Der Verdammte (1957) (German TV movie)
 Passport to Shame (1958)
 De Veroordeelde (1959) (Dutch TV movie)

External links

References

1926 births
Year of death uncertain
Year of death missing
20th-century British novelists